Connor Bunnaman (born April 16, 1998) is a Canadian professional ice hockey forward currently playing for the Charlotte Checkers of the American Hockey League (AHL) while under contract to the Florida Panthers of the National Hockey League (NHL). Bunnaman played in the Ontario Hockey League for the Kitchener Rangers before being drafted by the Philadelphia Flyers in the 2016 NHL Entry Draft.

Early life
Bunnaman was born on April 16, 1998, in Guelph, Ontario, Canada.

Playing career

Junior
Growing up, Bunnaman played for the Guelph Jr. Gryphons U16 AAA in the South Central Triple-A Hockey League U16. Following this, he was named to Team OMHA White, where he competed at the OHL Gold Cup U-16 tournament and earned an invitation to Canada’s national under-17 development camp. He was subsequently drafted 31st overall in the 2014 Ontario Hockey League (OHL) draft by the Kitchener Rangers. He scored his first career OHL goal during a 6–5 win over the Guelph Storm off an assist from Mike Davies on October 13, 2014. As the Rangers began their playoff berth against the London Knights, he recorded his first post-season goal during Game 2.

Bunnaman was drafted in the fourth round, 109th overall, by the Philadelphia Flyers in the 2016 NHL Entry Draft. Upon being drafted, Bunnaman stated that he felt he would fit in well with the team because he considered himself "a two-way, power forward. I create space well for others so I think I fit into their system well." Prior to the 2017–18 season, Bunnaman signed an entry-level contract with the team and was invited to participate in the Flyers' training camp. Upon returning, Bunnaman was named captain of the Kitchener Rangers alongside alternate captains Adam Mascherin, Connor Hall and Jake Henderson. At the night of the announcement, Bunnaman also played in his 200th career OHL game, tying Barry Duench for 41st place in franchise history for regular-season games played.

Professional

Philadelphia Flyers
Upon concluding his major junior ice hockey career, Bunnaman joined the Flyers' American Hockey League (AHL) affiliate, the Lehigh Valley Phantoms, for the 2018–19 season. He recorded his first professional goal on October 28, 2018, in a 3–1 loss against the Hershey Bears. After a slow start to the season, Bunnaman was moved to the teams' first line after Phil Varone was recalled by the Flyers and played alongside Greg Carey and Nicolas Aubé-Kubel. By December, he had a goal-scoring streak of three games and recorded the game winning goal during a game against the Belleville Senators. Bunnaman ended the season with 32 points in 62 games.

After participating in the Flyers' 2019 training camp, Bunnaman made his NHL debut on October 4, 2019, skating 11:06 minutes and recording two shots on goal. He split the 2019-20 season between the Flyers and the Phantoms, but recorded his first career NHL goal on January 13, 2020, against the Boston Bruins. He also joined the Flyers for the 2020 playoffs in Toronto.

Florida Panthers
On March 19, 2022, Bunnaman was involved in a trade that sent him along with Claude Giroux, German Rubtsov, and a draft pick to the Florida Panthers in exchange for Owen Tippett and some draft picks.

Career statistics

References

External links

1998 births
Canadian ice hockey centres
Charlotte Checkers (2010–) players
Ice hockey people from Ontario
Kitchener Rangers players
Lehigh Valley Phantoms players
Living people
Philadelphia Flyers draft picks
Philadelphia Flyers players
Sportspeople from Guelph